Horizon: A Review of Literature and Art was a literary magazine published in London, UK, between December 1939 and January 1950. Published every four weeks, it was edited by Cyril Connolly, who made it into a platform for a wide range of distinguished and emerging writers. It had a print run of 120 issues or 20 volumes.

Connolly founded Horizon after T. S. Eliot ended The Criterion in January 1939, with Peter Watson as its financial backer and de facto art editor. Connolly was editor throughout its publication and Stephen Spender was an  uncredited associate editor until early 1941. Connolly described the magazine's goal during World War II as

The magazine had a small circulation of around 9,500, but an impressive list of contributors, and it made a significant impact on the arts during and just after the war. Connolly issued an all-Irish number in 1941, an all-Swiss number in 1946 and a U. S. number in October 1947. There was also a French issue and one comprising The Loved One, the novel by Evelyn Waugh.

Paul Fussell praised Horizon as "one of the most civilized and civilizing of periodicals ... with material of almost unbelievable excellence". He described it as "Around 10,000 pages of exquisite poetry and prose and art reproductions, produced and read in the midst of the most discouraging and terrible destruction ... one of the high moments in the long history of British eccentricity". Waugh was less positive, telling Connolly that he heard "an ugly accent—RAF pansy" from the magazine. He twice satirized Connolly and Horizon, as Ambrose Silk and Ivory Tower in Put Out More Flags, and Everard Spruce and Survival in Sword of Honour. Spruce, like Connolly, was the editor of a literary review, liked good food and parties, and was surrounded by helpful young ladies. Two of the women at the magazine were Clarissa Eden and Sonia Brownell,  and Brownell met author George Orwell (whose real name was Eric Blair) through Horizon and later married him.

Selected list of contributors
Contributors included:

Gerald Abraham
Jankel Adler
Louis Aragon
W. H. Auden
A. J. Ayer
John Banting
George Barker
Arturo Barea
Béla Bartók
Cecil Beaton
John Betjeman
Alexander Blok
Paul Bowles
C. M. Bowra
Arthur Calder-Marshall
Kenneth Clark
Robert Colquhoun 
John Craxton
Benedetto Croce
R. H. Crossman
Nancy Cunard
Rhys Davies
Cecil Day-Lewis
Paul Brooks Davis
Lawrence Durrell
T. S. Eliot
Paul Eluard
William Empson
Gavin Ewart
Ian Fleming 
E. M. Forster
Lucian Freud
J. F. C. Fuller
Roy Fuller
David Gascoyne 
André Gide
W. S. Graham 
G. F. Green
Graham Greene
Philip Hendy
Barbara Hepworth 
Hermann Hesse
Terence Heywood
Brian Howard
Aldous Huxley
Robin Ironside
Christopher Isherwood
Randall Jarrell
Augustus John
Mervyn Jones-Evan
Pierre Jean Jouve
Anna Kavan
Paul Klee
Arthur Koestler
Philip Lamantia 
Osbert Lancaster 
Alun Lewis
James Lord (author)
Rose Macaulay
Cecily Mackworth
Julian MacLaren-Ross
Louis MacNeice
Olivia Manning
Rosemary Manning
André Masson
Robert Melville
Henry Miller
Nancy Mitford
Henry Moore
Alan Moorehead 
Paul Nash
Ben Nicholson
Sean O'Faolain
George Orwell
Jean Paulhan
John Piper
William Plomer
John Pope-Hennessy
J. B. Priestley
Peter Quennell
Kathleen Raine
Herbert Read
Edouard Roditi
John Rothenstein
Bertrand Russell
Vita Sackville-West
William Sansom
Jean-Paul Sartre
Osbert Sitwell
Logan Pearsall Smith
Stephen Spender
Enid Starkie
Wallace Stevens
G. W. Stonier
Graham Sutherland
A. J. A. Symons
Dylan Thomas
Peter Ustinov
John Waller
Vernon Watkins
Denton Welch 
H. G. Wells
Eudora Welty 
Patrick White
Diana Witherby
Rollo Woolley
Virginia Woolf
Beryl de Zoete

References

1940 establishments in the United Kingdom
1949 disestablishments in the United Kingdom
Defunct literary magazines published in the United Kingdom
Magazines established in 1940
Magazines disestablished in 1949
Magazines published in London
Monthly magazines published in the United Kingdom
Works by Cyril Connolly